Paul Brumfitt (born 1956) is an English serial killer responsible for the murders of three people in the United Kingdom and Denmark. Initially serving three life sentences, he was released in 1994, only to kill yet again in 1999 and be returned to prison.

Initial murders and detention
With a rap sheet dating back to 1968, Brumfitt's first murders began in July 1979, when he got into an argument with his 16-year-old girlfriend. In his anger, he went on a 8-day rampage, first strangling 59-year-old shopkeeper Sidney Samuel in Tilbury, Essex. Afterwards, he jumped aboard a ferry and found himself in Denmark, where not long after he strangled to death 40-year-old bus driver Teddy Laustrup in Esbjerg.

He was quickly caught and returned to England to stand trial at the Old Bailey for the two murders there, and in August 1980, he pleaded guilty to two counts of manslaughter on the grounds of diminished responsibility. The presiding judge recognized that the defendant suffered from several psychiatric disorders, but nevertheless ordered that he be sentenced to three life sentences. He remained in prison until November 1994, when psychiatrists declared that he no longer posed a threat to society, and Brumfitt was released from prison. As per the conditions of his parole, he was employed by the Dudley Council as a temporary assistant gardener under the Rehabilitation of Offenders Act, had to be strictly supervised and had to spend six months at a hostel before he could be allowed full release.

Murder of Marcella Davis
Unbeknownst to his probation officer, Brumfitt regularly visited sex workers in Dudley's red light district. On February 7, 1999, he picked up 19-year-old Marcella Ann Davis, a sex worker on Wolverhampton's Shakespeare Street, and took her back to his flat in Woodsetton. There, he murdered her in an undetermined manner and then took Marcella’s body to a small yard he had rented on Cooper Street, where he dismembered her and set her alight.

While authorities were searching for Davis, Brumfitt continued picking up various sex workers, several of whom he raped. In March 1999, he was arrested on suspicion of killing Davis, but initially refused to cooperate with authorities. After 30 hours had passed, he finally admitted to the murder and pointed investigators towards where he had buried her. Through the use of dental records and a small bunch of keys, the burned corpse was positively identified as that of Davis.

Trial, imprisonment and aftermath
Shortly afterwards, Brumfitt was brought to stand trial at Birmingham Crown Court, where he was convicted of killing Marcella Davis and raping two other sex workers at knifepoint, for which he was given three additional life sentences, but acquitted of a third rape.

The case drew outrage from both law enforcement and Tory politician Michael Fabricant, who postulated that a dangerous offender like Brumfitt could have been labeled 'cured' and allowed to leave prison was unacceptable. As a result, the prison service announced that it would consider revising the parole review process, in order to prevent potentially violent lifers from being released and causing more crimes.

See also
 List of serial killers in the United Kingdom
 Alun Kyte, fellow killer of prostitutes in the Midlands

References

Bibliography
 
 
 
 

1956 births
20th-century English criminals
English male criminals
English people convicted of manslaughter
English people convicted of murder
English people convicted of rape
English prisoners and detainees
English prisoners sentenced to life imprisonment
English rapists
English serial killers
Living people
Male serial killers
People acquitted of rape
People convicted of murder by the United Kingdom
People from Dudley
Prisoners and detainees of the United Kingdom
Prisoners sentenced to life imprisonment by the United Kingdom
Violence against women in the United Kingdom